Honey Creek is a stream in Johnson County, Indiana, in the United States. It is a tributary of the White River.

Honey Creek was so named from the fact pioneers found a nest of honeybees there.

See also
List of rivers of Indiana

References

Rivers of Johnson County, Indiana
Rivers of Indiana